Manfred Sommer (May 27, 1933 – October 3, 2007) was a Spanish comics artist, best known for the reporter comics series Frank Cappa.

Career

Sommer was born at San Sebastián.

He began his career as an informal pupil of Jesus Blasco, and received creative support from the Blasco family during his young years. Sommer's main influences were Milton Caniff, Frank Robbins and Hugo Pratt.

Sommer created the series El Lobo Solitario, Polux, and El Tigre, before launching his first great success in 1981, Frank Cappa, which was published in the comics magazine Cimoc. Joining the Spanish creators such as Jordi Bernet, Antonio Segura, Leopold Sánchez and José Ortiz, Sommer was part of the ambitious though short-lived Metropol initiative which published three magazines in the early 1980s, Metropol, Mocambo and KO cómics.

Bibliography of French titles 
 Frank Cappa
1. Frank Cappa au Brésil (1984, Les Humanoïdes Associés)
2. Somoza et Gomorrhe (1986, Kesselring)
3. Le dernier africain (1988, Kesselring)
4. Viet-Song! (1989, Dargaud)

References

 Manfred Sommer publications in Métal Hurlant and Pilote BDoubliées 
 Manfred Sommer albums Bedetheque 

Footnotes

External links
Manfred Sommer biography on Lambiek Comiclopedia
"Manfred Sommer portarà una antologia de Cappa a la Massana" Diari d'Andorra article 

1933 births
2007 deaths
People from San Sebastián
Spanish comics artists
20th-century Spanish artists